Isabelle Harvey  (born 27 March 1975) is a Canadian soccer player who played as a forward for the Canada women's national soccer team. She was part of the team at the 1999 FIFA Women's World Cup.

References

External links
 
 

1975 births
Living people
Canadian women's soccer players
Canada women's international soccer players
Place of birth missing (living people)
1999 FIFA Women's World Cup players
Women's association football forwards
USC Trojans women's soccer players
21st-century Canadian women